Basso profondo (Italian: "deep bass"), sometimes basso profundo, contrabass or oktavist, is the lowest bass voice type.

While The New Grove Dictionary of Opera defines a typical bass as having a range that is limited to the second E below middle C (E2), operatic bassi profondi can be called on to sing low C (C2), as in the role of Baron Ochs in Der Rosenkavalier. Often choral composers make use of lower notes, such as G1 or even F1; in such rare cases the choir relies on exceptionally deep-ranged bassi profondi termed oktavists or octavists, who sometimes sing an octave below the bass part.

Bass singer Tim Storms holds the Guinness World Record for the "lowest note produced by a human".

Definition

According to Rousseau (1775): "Basse-contres – the most profound of all voices, singing lower than the bass like a double bass, and should not be confused with contrabasses, which are instruments."

Oktavist
An oktavist is an exceptionally deep-ranged basso profondo, especially typical of Russian Orthodox choral music. This voice type has a vocal range which extends down to A (an octave below the baritone range) and sometimes to F (an octave below the bass staff) with the extreme lows for oktavists, such as Mikhail Zlatopolsky or Alexander Ort, reaching C.

Slavic choral composers sometimes make use of lower notes such as B1 as in Rachmaninoff's All-Night Vigil, G#1 in "The Twelve Brigands" by Vladimir Pasjukov, G in "Ne otverzhi mene" by Pavel Chesnokov, or F1 in "Kheruvimskaya pesn" (Song of Cherubim) by Krzysztof Penderecki, although such notes sometimes also appear in repertoire by non-Slavic composers (e.g. B1 appears in Gustav Mahler's Second and Eighth Symphonies).

See also 
Bass
Fach
Vocal weight

References

Further reading

 
Morosan, Vladimir Choral Performance in Pre-revolutionary Russia, UMI Research Press, 1986.

External links
 
 oktavism.com, website dedicated to the oktavist voice

Voice types
Italian opera terminology
Bass (sound)